Wendover Air Force Base is a former United States Air Force base in Utah now known as Wendover Airport. During World War II, it was a training base for B-17 and B-24 bomber crews. It was the training site of the 509th Composite Group, the B-29 unit that carried out the atomic bombings of Hiroshima and Nagasaki.

After the war, Wendover was used for training exercises, gunnery range and as a research facility. It was closed by the Air Force in 1969, and the base was given to Wendover City in 1977. Tooele County, Utah, assumed ownership of the airport and base buildings in 1998, and the County continues to operate the airfield as a public airport. A portion of the original bombing range is now the Utah Test and Training Range (UTTR) which is used extensively by the Air Force with live fire targets on the range.

Origins
Wendover Air Force Base's history began in 1940, when the United States Army began looking for additional bombing ranges. Though isolated, the area was served by the Western Pacific Railroad, and many of its citizens were employed by the railroad.

Construction of the base began on 20 September 1940 and on the range on 4 November 1940. Wendover Air Base became a subpost of Fort Douglas in Salt Lake City on 29 July 1941. Ranchers protested the loss of their grazing land, which they claimed would wipe them out and cost the state of Utah $1.5 million annually. They took their complaints to Governor Henry Hooper Blood, but the War Department pressed on with the development of the bombing range. The first military contingent arrived on 12 August 1941, to construct targets on the bombing range. To provide water, a pipeline was run from a spring on Pilot Peak to the base.

World War II

With the entrance of the United States into World War II, Wendover Field took on greater importance. It was the Army Air Force's largest bombing and gunnery range. In March 1942 the Army Air Force activated Wendover Army Air Field and also assigned the research and development of guided missiles, pilotless aircraft, and remotely controlled bombs to the site. The new base was supplied and serviced by the Ogden Air Depot at Hill Field. In April 1942, the Wendover Sub-Depot was activated and assumed technical and administrative control of the field, under the Ogden Air Depot. The Wendover Sub-Depot was tasked to requisition, store, and issue all Army Air Forces property for organizations stationed at Wendover Field for training.

By late 1943 there were some 2,000 civilian employees and 17,500 military personnel at Wendover. Construction at the base continued for most of the war, including three  paved runways, taxiways, a  ramp, and seven hangars. By May 1945 the base consisted of 668 buildings, including a 300-bed hospital, gymnasium, swimming pool, library, chapel, cafeteria, bowling alley, two movie theatres, and 361 housing units for married officers and civilians.

Heavy Bombardment Group training
Wendover's mission was to train heavy bomb groups. The training of Boeing B-17 Flying Fortress and Consolidated B-24 Liberator groups began in April 1942, with the arrival of the 306th Bomb Group flying B-17s. From March 1942 through April 1944, Wendover AAF hosted twenty newly formed B-17 and B-24 groups during one phase of their group training. The Second Air Force organized bombardment training into three phases. In the first, training focused on the individual crew members. In the second, training involved the whole crew, who would conduct training together. The third and final phase saw the group's crews training together, with formation flying and practice combat missions. Until the end of 1943, each phase of training was conducted at a different base.

Fighter training
In April 1944, the role of Wendover Army Air Base changed with the arrival from Louisiana of P-47 fighters of the 72nd Fighter Wing.
The program ended in September after three groups, totalling 180 men, had been trained.

509th Composite Group

In June 1943, preparations began for the operational use of atomic bombs. Although not as suitable for the atomic mission as the British Avro Lancaster with its cavernous  bomb bay, Major General Leslie R. Groves, Jr., the director of the Manhattan Project, and General Henry H. Arnold, the Chief of United States Army Air Forces (USAAF), wanted to use an American plane, if this was at all possible, so the Boeing B-29 Superfortress was chosen, even though it required substantial modification. The modification project was codenamed Silverplate, but this codename eventually came to identify the training and operational aspects of the program as well.

Arnold selected Lieutenant Colonel Paul Tibbets, an officer with a distinguished combat record in Europe and North Africa, who had expert knowledge of the B-29 as one of its test pilots, to form and train a group to deliver atomic bombs. Tibbets chose the Wendover over Great Bend, Kansas, and Mountain Home, Idaho, as the location for his training program. It was remote, which was good for secrecy and security, but within reasonable distance by air from the Manhattan Project's Site Y, at Los Alamos, New Mexico, and the Naval Auxiliary Air Station Salton Sea, where bombing tables for the mission would be prepared.  The base was given the code name "Kingman", and became the Manhattan Project's Site K. The activity to assemble, modify and flight test prototype bombs was named "Project W-47".

On 14 September 1944, the 393d Bomb Squadron arrived at Wendover from its former base at Fairmont Army Air Base, Nebraska, where it had been an operational training unit (OTU) with the 504th Bombardment Group since 12 March. When its parent group deployed to the Marianas in early November 1944, the squadron was assigned directly to the Second Air Force until creation of the 509th Composite Group on 17 December 1944. As part of the formation of the 509th, about 800 people stationed at the field, were transferred to the new group. To make the 509th Composite Group as self-contained as possible, other units were assigned, including the 390th Air Service Group, with the 603d Air Engineering and 1027th Materiel Squadrons; the 320th Troop Carrier Squadron, known as the "Green Hornet Airlines"; the 1395th Military Police Company, and later the 1st Ordnance Squadron. A Manhattan Project unit, the 1st Technical Detachment, was attached to the group.

The 216th Army Air Forces Base Unit (Special) constructed prototype atomic weapons (without nuclear material) and drop tested them. Little was known about the flight characteristics of the prototype atom bomb designs and how the fusing mechanism would work. In February 1945, a Flight Test Section was created within the 216th Army Air Forces Base Unit to carry out testing with prototype bombs in the shape of the Little Boy and Fat Man bombs. It was originally equipped with five Silverplate B-29s, three flight crews and five maintenance crews. To help out with an increasingly demanding schedule, four crews from the 393d Bombardment Squadron were made available. The Flight Test Section carried out 24 drop tests in June and 30 in July. About two-thirds of the June tests were with Fat Man shapes and the rest with Little Boy ones. In July, all but four of the tests were with Fat Man shapes, some with explosive-filled Pumpkin bombs. Test drops were carried out at Wendover, at the Naval Ordnance Test Station at Inyokern, and at the Naval Auxiliary Air Station Salton Sea. Testing continued up to the last minute, with the Fat Man firing unit, known as the X-unit, only being successfully tested at Wendover on 4 August, and a final test of the X-unit was carried out six days later.

The aircrews trained continuously until May. Each bombardier completed at least 50 practice drops of inert pumpkin bombs before Tibbets declared his group combat-ready. The ground support echelon of the 509th Composite Group received movement orders and moved by rail on 26 April 1945 to its port of embarkation at Seattle, Washington. On 6 May the support elements sailed on the SS Cape Victory for the Marianas, while group materiel was shipped on the SS Emile Berliner. An advance party of the air echelon flew by C-54 to North Field, Tinian, between 15 and 22 May. It was joined by the ground echelon on 29 May 1945, marking the group's official change of station. It was from Tinian that it carried out the atomic bombings of Hiroshima and Nagasaki.

The 216th Army Air Forces Base Unit moved to Oxnard Field in September 1945, where it was transferred to the Manhattan District's 9812th Technical Services Unit on 17 December 1945. Oxnard was later designated Sandia Base. The Special Ordnance Detachment took with it its special tools and equipment, and even some of its buildings. The test program resumed at Sandia in January 1946.

JB-2 Testing

In early September 1944, a detachment of the Special Weapons Branch, Wright Field, Ohio, arrived at Wendover with thirteen Republic-Ford JB-2 flying bombs.  The JB-2 was a United States copy of the Nazi V-1 flying bomb, which was reverse-engineered from malfunctioning wrecks of V-1s recovered in England.  The United States JB-2 was different from the German V-1 in only the smallest of dimensions. At Wendover, a launch ramp was constructed for the JB-2, engineered from plans developed from aerial photographs of ramps used by the Germans in the Low Countries.  In addition to the ground launch ramp, a B-17 Flying Fortress was modified to be able to carry the jet bomb underneath a wing and air launch it.  Numerous tests were conducted and an initial production order was 1,000 units was made by the Army, with subsequent planned production of 1,000 per month. The fortunes of war in Europe in the spring of 1945 led to the decision to use the JB-2 in the Pacific Theater, to be used as part of Operation Downfall, the planned invasion of Japan. The sudden end of the war in September 1945 led to the curtailment of the JB-2 program and the weapon was never used in combat.

Postwar use
The training of B-29 aircrews and the testing of prototype atom bombs was the last major contribution of Wendover Field during World War II. After war's end, some crew training continued, but at a reduced level. For a while, B-29s which had returned from the Marianas were flown to Wendover for storage. In the summer of 1946, the Ogden Air Technical Service Command at Hill Army Air Field north of Salt Lake City assumed jurisdiction over all operations at Wendover Field except engineering and technical projects.

A fast-moving fire on the night of 6 July 1946 destroyed a hangar and seven buildings, described as "mobile-type, wooden structures", as well as six training planes, before it was brought under control. Damage was estimated at US$1.5 million by Colonel Ray Harris, commanding officer, Ogden Air Technical Command.

Wendover played a key role in the postwar weapons development industry with three areas being developed. The first was further testing of the JB-2 Loon flying bomb.  In the case of the second area, the B-17 Flying Fortress, obsolete as a combat aircraft, was being tested to fly remotely.  Gliding bombs, based on captured technology from the wartime Henschel Hs 293 German radio-controlled glide bomb were being developed that could be controlled by radar or radio. The third consisted of bombs that could be controlled by the launching plane.  The historic GAPA (ground to air pilotless aircraft) Boeing project resulted in the first supersonic flight of an American Air Force vehicle on 6 August 1946. In March 1947, the Air Proving Ground Command research programs were moved to Alamogordo Army Airfield, New Mexico.  As a result, 1,200 personnel from Wendover Field were moved to New Mexico from Utah and were relocated to Alamogordo to conduct guided missile research projects. Three ongoing projects were transferred: Ground-to-Air Pilotless Aircraft (GAPA), JB-2 Loon flight testing, and ASM-A-1 Tarzon gliding bomb.

Transferred to the Strategic Air Command' Fifteenth Air Force in March 1947. With the establishment of the U.S. Air Force as an independent service later that year, the installation was renamed Wendover Air Force Base in 1947, but while bombardment groups deploying on maneuvers used the bombing range, the rest of the base remained unused. It was inactivated in 1948 and declared surplus, although retained in a caretaker status. The Air Materiel Command assumed responsibility for the base in July 1950, placing it under the jurisdiction of the Ogden Air Material Area at Hill Air Force Base. Between 1950 and 1954, the base was manned by a skeleton crew of thirteen. The buildings deteriorated. Some were removed, some demolished, and some burned down.

Tactical Air Command (TAC) reactivated the base under the Ninth Air Force on 1 October 1954, and tactical units deployed there for exercises, utilizing the base for the next four years. TAC invested several million dollars renovating the base facilities, and constructed new targets on the range. But only 331 personnel were assigned to the base in 1956. The base was deactivated again in December 1957. It transferred back to Ogden on 1 January 1958 and renamed Wendover Air Force Auxiliary Field, while the range was renamed Hill Air Force Range in 1960, and inactivated in August 1961.

The base was reactivated on 15 July 1961, but the only personnel based there were a fifteen-man firefighting detachment. By 1962, when the base was again deactivated, only 128 of the original 668 buildings remained. The General Services Administration (GSA) wanted to sell the base to the town of Wendover, leaving only the bombing ranges and radar site with the Air Force. The base was renamed Decker Field, and again declared surplus in 1972. The base continued to be used occasionally for training by Air National Guard units, and the firefighting detachment remained until 1977.

Wendover was officially listed on the National Register of Historic Places on 1 July 1975. The entire facility was declared surplus in 1976, and on 9 July 1976, the water system and its annexes were transferred to the city of Wendover, Utah. The GSA deeded most of the base, including runways, taxiways, hangars, hospital complex, and several warehouses to Wendover for a civil airport on 15 August 1977.

Beginning in 1980 the 4440th Tactical Fighter Training Group began holding regular exercises known as Red Flag from Nellis AFB, Nevada. These exercises used Wendover, with over 9,000 men and women deployed to Decker Field, Utah. About 5,200 sorties were flown, representing over 9,500 flying hours. Red Flag exercises at Wendover were discontinued after 1986. The U.S. Air Force relinquished the remainder of Decker Field to the town of Wendover in 1992.

Current uses

, Wendover Air Force Base is used as a civil airport, with an unusually long runway for such a facility (there are two  runways).

The airfield is very isolated in northwest Utah, sitting in the middle of a vast wasteland miles away from any major population center. It is probably for this reason, and the dry hot climate, that much of the airfield remains today. Still-extant facilities include the vast runway system, numerous ramps, taxiways, dispersal pads, and most of the original hangars (including the Enola Gay B-29 hangar). Most of the hospital complex and many barracks remain, as does a chow hall, chapel, swimming pool and many other World War II-era buildings.

In 2009, a hangar at the base dubbed The Manhattan Project's Enola Gay Hangar was listed as one of the most endangered historic sites in the United States. A local group, "Historic Wendover Airfield", is attempting to preserve the former base.

Numerous films, television shows and documentaries have been filmed using Wendover Field, including The Philadelphia Experiment (1984), Con Air (1997), Mulholland Falls (1996), Independence Day (1996), Hulk (2003) and The Core (2003).

See also

 Utah World War II Army Airfields
 List of HABS documentation of Wendover Air Force Base

References

Sources

External links

Historic Wendover Airfield
Wendover AFB at Abandoned & Little-Known Airfields
Return to Wendover in 2005: An interview with Paul Tibbets Jr.
Aviation: From Sand Dunes to Sonic Booms, a National Park Service Discover Our Shared Heritage Travel Itinerary
, and many other records for subsidiary structures
Center for Land Use Interpretation Wendover Residency Unit

Airports in Utah
Buildings and structures in Tooele County, Utah
Formerly Used Defense Sites in Utah
Manhattan Project sites
Government buildings on the National Register of Historic Places in Utah
Military facilities on the National Register of Historic Places in Utah
National Register of Historic Places in Tooele County, Utah
Historic American Buildings Survey in Utah
Transportation in Tooele County, Utah
Military installations closed in 1957